Kinnelon is a borough in Morris County, New Jersey, United States, located approximately  west of New York City. As of the 2020 United States census, the borough's population was 9,966, a drop of 282 (-2.8%) from the 2010 census count of 10,248, which in turn reflected an increase of 883 (+9.4%) from the 9,365 counted in the 2000 census. It is a low-density, suburban community, with many parks and trails.

Once known as Charlotteburg, Kinnelon was formed as a borough by an act of the New Jersey Legislature on February 20, 1922, from portions of Pequannock Township, based on the results of a referendum passed on March 21, 1922. The borough's name comes from Francis S. Kinney, who purchased  of land in the 1880s for an estate that included Lake Kinnelon, and built St. Hubert's Chapel in 1886 on an island in the lake.

Kinnelon is home to Smoke Rise, an upscale private gated community that describes itself as one of the oldest gated communities in the United States.

In 2012, Forbes.com listed Kinnelon as 462nd in its listing of "America's Most Expensive ZIP Codes", with a median home price of $630,414.

The borough is one of the state's highest-income communities. Based on data from the American Community Survey (ACS) for 2014–2018, Kinnelon residents had a median household income of $156,048, almost double the statewide median of $79,363.

History
Once known as Charlotteburg (named after Charlotte, wife of King George III of Great Britain), Kinnelon was formed as a borough by an act of the New Jersey Legislature on February 20, 1922, from portions of Pequannock Township, based on the results of a referendum passed on March 21, 1922. 

By the 1880s Francis Kinney, a 19th-century industrialist who founded Kinney Brothers Tobacco Company built an estate that dates back to 1884. His son, Morris Kinney, for whom the borough of Kinnelon was named 41 years later, lived most of his life on the estate.

Upon Morris Kinney's death in 1945, he left the estate to longtime friend John Talbot Sr., former mayor of the borough, and a founder of the Chilton Memorial Hospital, Pompton Plains (John Talbot Sr. was a real estate developer in New York City and a patron of the arts and was credited with the revival of ballet as a major art form in the United States in the 1930s), as a tribute to their lifetime friendship and mutually shared love of Smoke Rise.

Following the Second World War, the need for suburban housing became evident, John Talbot Sr. went on to create The Smoke Rise Club, one of the earliest community club plans in the United States. Unlike so many developers, he insisted that the land be kept in its natural state as far as possible. When friends asked to purchase land on the estate to build homes, Talbot decided to develop a planned community designed primarily to serve New York corporation executives. The Smoke Rise Club was the result in November 1946.

Geography
According to the United States Census Bureau, the borough had a total area of 19.24 square miles (49.82 km2), including 18.03 square miles (46.70 km2) of land and 1.21 square miles (3.13 km2) of water (6.27%).

Tripod Rock is located in Kinnelon's Pyramid Mountain Natural Historical Area, portions of which are located in the borough.

Unincorporated communities, localities and place names located partially or completely within the township include Bald Hill, Brook Valley, Charlottesburg, Fayson Lakes, Ideal Lake, Jacksonville, Saw Mill Pond, Smoke Rise, Stickle Pond, Sun Tan Lake, Surprise Lake and Untermeyer Lake.

The highest mountain in Kinnelon is Kitty Ann Mountain.

Portions of the borough are owned by the City of Newark, Essex County, for their Pequannock River Watershed, which provides water to the city from an area of  that also includes portions of Hardyston Township, Jefferson Township, Rockaway Township, Vernon Township and West Milford.

Kinnelon borders the municipalities of Boonton Township, Butler, Lincoln Park, Montville, Pequannock Township, Riverdale and Rockaway Township in Morris County; and West Milford in Passaic County.

Demographics

2010 census

The Census Bureau's 2006–2010 American Community Survey showed that (in 2010 inflation-adjusted dollars) median household income was $129,664 (with a margin of error of +/− $11,416) and the median family income was $144,318 (+/− $7,698). Males had a median income of $98,094 (+/− $7,382) versus $71,886 (+/− $9,897) for females. The per capita income for the borough was $56,826 (+/− $3,939). About 1.4% of families and 1.5% of the population were below the poverty line, including 1.4% of those under age 18 and 0.8% of those age 65 or over.

2000 census
As of the 2000 United States census there were 9,365 people, 3,062 households, and 2,685 families residing in the borough. The population density was 523.5 people per square mile (202.1/km2). There were 3,123 housing units at an average density of 174.6 per square mile (67.4/km2). The racial makeup of the borough was 95.60% White, 0.58% African American, 0.04% Native American, 2.84% Asian, 0.10% Pacific Islander, 0.23% from other races, and 0.61% from two or more races. Hispanic or Latino people of any race were 2.33% of the population.

There were 3,062 households, out of which 45.4% had children under the age of 18 living with them, 80.6% were married couples living together, 5.3% had a female householder with no husband present, and 12.3% were non-families. 9.4% of all households were made up of individuals, and 3.6% had someone living alone who was 65 years of age or older. The average household size was 3.06 and the average family size was 3.27.

In the borough the population was spread out, with 30.0% under the age of 18, 4.3% from 18 to 24, 27.0% from 25 to 44, 29.7% from 45 to 64, and 9.0% who were 65 years of age or older. The median age was 40 years. For every 100 females, there were 99.6 males. For every 100 females age 18 and over, there were 95.9 males.

The median income for a household in the borough was $105,991, and the median income for a family was $110,593. Males had a median income of $88,870 versus $65,069 for females. The per capita income for the borough was $45,796. About 2.3% of families and 2.6% of the population were below the poverty line, including 2.9% of those under age 18 and 0.6% of those age 65 or over.

Club communities

Kinnelon is home to two club communities: Smoke Rise and Fayson Lakes.

 Smoke Rise is an upscale private gated residential community established in 1948.
 Fayson Lakes was founded in 1925 around three lakes located in the southeastern corner of the borough. It is named for the developers who started the community, Frank Fay Jr. and his son Frank Fay III. It has a variety of homes of different sizes and styles ranging from rustic winterized cabins to opulent custom-built homes.

Parks and recreation

 Silas Condict County Park – located on Kinnelon Road. It was established in 1963 and it includes picnic areas, athletic fields, hiking trails, and the Casino, an old house that was represented as a speakeasy in the Prohibition era. The Casino is used for parties, rentals, and other events. The park has a big lake, good for fishing and paddle boating. Paddle boats are available for renting at the park. The park is operated by the Morris County Park Commission.
 Stony Brook Park – located on Valley Road. It includes recreational areas and playgrounds surrounded by a lake.

Economy
 Meadtown Shopping Center – a shopping center located on Route 23 in Kinnelon. It has stores and restaurants including Petco and Marshalls.

Government

Local government
Kinnelon is governed under the Borough form of New Jersey municipal government, which is used in 218 municipalities (of the 564) statewide, making it the most common form of government in New Jersey. The governing body is comprised of a Mayor and a Borough Council, with all positions elected at-large on a partisan basis as part of the November general election. A Mayor is elected directly by the voters to a four-year term of office. The Borough Council is comprised of six members elected to serve three-year terms on a staggered basis, with two seats coming up for election each year in a three-year cycle. The Borough form of government used by Kinnelon is a "weak mayor / strong council" government in which council members act as the legislative body with the mayor presiding at meetings and voting only in the event of a tie. The mayor can veto ordinances subject to an override by a two-thirds majority vote of the council. The mayor makes committee and liaison assignments for council members, and most appointments are made by the mayor with the advice and consent of the council.

, the Mayor of Kinnelon is Republican James J. Freda, whose term of office ends December 31, 2022. Members of the Borough Council are Council President Randall I. Charles (R, 2023), James Lorkowski (R, 2022), Sean Mabey (R, 20203), Robert R. Roy (R, 2022), Vincent Russo (R, 2024) and William Yago (R, 2024).

Vincent Russo was appointed to fill the seat expiring in December 2018 that had been held by Carol M. Sventy. In January 2018, James Lorkowski was appointed to fill the seat expiring in December 2019 that had been held by James Freda.

In January 2017, Glenn Sisco was selected from three candidates nominated by the Republican municipal committee and appointed to fill the council seat expiring in December 2017 that had been held by Adam N. Barish; Sisco, served on an interim basis until the November 2017 general election. Sisco served as the mayor of Kinnelon for 42 years, making him one of the longest-serving mayors in the state of New Jersey.

In March 2016, the Borough Council unanimously selected William Neely from three candidates nominated by the Republican municipal committee to fill the seat expiring in December 2016 that had been held by Stephen Cobell until his resignation the previous month after nearly 12 years in office; Neely will serve on an interim basis until the November 2016 general election, when voters will choose a candidate to serve the balance of the term of office.

Selected by a 3–2 majority of the borough council from among three potential candidates, Clifford Giantonio was sworn into office in April 2014 to fill the vacant seat of Ronald Mondello, who had resigned in the previous month citing personal and work conflicts.

Federal, state and county representation
Kinnelon is located in the 11th Congressional District and is part of New Jersey's 26th state legislative district.

 

Morris County is governed by a Board of County Commissioners comprised of seven members who are elected at-large in partisan elections to three-year terms on a staggered basis, with either one or three seats up for election each year as part of the November general election. Actual day-to-day operation of departments is supervised by County Administrator, John Bonanni. , Morris County's Commissioners are
Commissioner Director Tayfun Selen (R, Chatham Township, term as commissioner ends December 31, 2023; term as director ends 2022),
Commissioner Deputy Director John Krickus (R, Washington Township, term as commissioner ends 2024; term as deputy director ends 2022),
Douglas Cabana (R, Boonton Township, 2022), 
Kathryn A. DeFillippo (R, Roxbury, 2022),
Thomas J. Mastrangelo (R, Montville, 2022),
Stephen H. Shaw (R, Mountain Lakes, 2024) and
Deborah Smith (R, Denville, 2024).
The county's constitutional officers are the County Clerk and County Surrogate (both elected for five-year terms of office) and the County Sheriff (elected for a three-year term). , they are 
County Clerk Ann F. Grossi (R, Parsippany–Troy Hills, 2023),
Sheriff James M. Gannon (R, Boonton Township, 2022) and
Surrogate Heather Darling (R, Roxbury, 2024).

Politics
As of March 23, 2011, there were a total of 7,122 registered voters in Kinnelon, of which 1,117 (15.7%) were registered as Democrats, 3,310 (46.5%) were registered as Republicans and 2,694 (37.8%) were registered as Unaffiliated. There was one voter registered to another party.

In the 2012 presidential election, Republican Mitt Romney received 65.5% of the vote (3,497 cast), ahead of Democrat Barack Obama with 33.2% (1,772 votes), and other candidates with 1.3% (68 votes), among the 5,354 ballots cast by the borough's 7,463 registered voters (17 ballots were spoiled), for a turnout of 71.7%. In the 2008 presidential election, Republican John McCain received 62.4% of the vote (3,638 cast), ahead of Democrat Barack Obama with 36.1% (2,105 votes) and other candidates with 0.9% (55 votes), among the 5,829 ballots cast by the borough's 7,334 registered voters, for a turnout of 79.5%. In the 2004 presidential election, Republican George W. Bush received 64.4% of the vote (3,517 ballots cast), outpolling Democrat John Kerry with 34.7% (1,895 votes) and other candidates with 0.5% (35 votes), among the 5,463 ballots cast by the borough's 6,955 registered voters, for a turnout percentage of 78.5.

In the 2013 gubernatorial election, Republican Chris Christie received 75.3% of the vote (2,419 cast), ahead of Democrat Barbara Buono with 23.5% (754 votes), and other candidates with 1.3% (41 votes), among the 3,260 ballots cast by the borough's 7,424 registered voters (46 ballots were spoiled), for a turnout of 43.9%. In the 2009 gubernatorial election, Republican Chris Christie received 66.2% of the vote (2,669 ballots cast), ahead of Democrat Jon Corzine with 25.6% (1,032 votes), Independent Chris Daggett with 5.9% (237 votes) and other candidates with 1.5% (61 votes), among the 4,034 ballots cast by the borough's 7,167 registered voters, yielding a 56.3% turnout.

Education
The Kinnelon Public Schools serves students in pre-kindergarten through twelfth grade. As of the 2020–21 school year, the district, comprised of four schools, had an enrollment of 1,670 students and 165.0 classroom teachers (on an FTE basis), for a student–teacher ratio of 10.1:1. Schools in the district (with 2020–21 enrollment data from the National Center for Education Statistics) are 
Kiel Elementary School with 312 students in grades Pre-K–2, 
Stonybrook Elementary School with 346 students in grades 3–5, 
Pearl R. Miller Middle School with 427 students in grades 6–8 and 
Kinnelon High School with 570 students in grades 9–12. In 2016, Kinnelon High School was named #3 in the state by New Jersey Monthly magazine, the school's highest ranking ever in the magazine's biannual rankings, and was listed as a top 500 high school by Newsweek.

Our Lady of the Magnificat School, a Catholic school that had been operated since 1964 under the auspices of the Roman Catholic Diocese of Paterson, closed after the 2009–10 school year in the face of declining enrollment and increasing deficits that the parish could no longer sustain.

Transportation

Roads and highways

Route 23 runs along the northern border of the borough. Interstate 287 passes through in the southeastern area, but the closest exit is along Route 23 in neighboring Riverdale.

Public transportation
NJ Transit provides bus service to the Port Authority Bus Terminal in Midtown Manhattan on the 194 route. The 304 route provides seasonal service to Mountain Creek in Vernon Township.

Notable people

People who were born in, residents of, or otherwise closely associated with Kinnelon include:
 Juan Agudelo (born 1992), soccer player for the New England Revolution in Major League Soccer
 Kurt Allerman (born 1955), former NFL football player
 Laura Benanti (born 1979), musical theatre actress who has appeared in numerous Broadway theatre productions
 Missy Elliott (born 1971), rapper, singer, songwriter, record producer, dancer and philanthropist
 DJ Envy (born 1977), DJ who works on the syndicated radio show The Breakfast Club on Power 105.1
 Herbert O. Fisher (1909–1990), test pilot and aviation executive
 Ray Forrest (1916–1999), pioneering TV announcer, host and news broadcaster from the earliest era of television
 Bryan Gallego (born 1993), professional soccer player
 Erik Hanson (born 1965), former Major League baseball pitcher
 Brett Hearn (born 1958), modified stock car driver
 Ian Joyce (born 1985), professional soccer player who played for the Major League Soccer club Colorado Rapids
 Stearns Matthews (born 1984), cabaret singer, recording artist, director, teacher and pianist
 Roman Oben (born 1972), former NFL football player
 William A. Pailes (born 1952), astronaut who flew as a payload specialist aboard STS-51-J on the Space Shuttle Atlantis
 Elise Testone (born 1983), singer and American Idol contestant
 Harry L. Towe (1898–1977), Congressman who represented New Jersey's 9th congressional district from 1943 to 1951

References

External links

 Kinnelon Borough website
 Kinnelon Public Schools
 
 School Data for the Kinnelon Public Schools, National Center for Education Statistics
 Silas Condict County Park

 
1922 establishments in New Jersey
Borough form of New Jersey government
Boroughs in Morris County, New Jersey
Populated places established in 1922